WSQR (1180 AM) is a radio station broadcasting a classic hits format. Licensed to Sycamore, Illinois, the station is owned by Nelson Multimedia Inc. WSQR also broadcasts on FM translators W225CC 92.9 Sycamore, W263BM 100.5 DeKalb, and W273CZ 102.5 Plano.

History
WSQR began broadcasting on June 11, 1981, and was owned by Hometown Communications. The station originally broadcast at 1560 kHz, running 250 watts during daytime hours only. The station originally aired a MOR-adult contemporary format, with the slogan "Welcome to Our Sunshine". A year later, the station began airing a country music format. In Spring 1989, the station began airing an oldies format. In late 1990, the station switched back to a country music format.

In 1993, after being silent, the station adopted a modern rock format, while temporarily being run by Northern Illinois University students. The station again went silent in January 1994.

In 1994, the station was sold to Larry and Pamela Nelson. The station returned to the air at 6 a.m. on December 5, 1994, airing soft adult contemporary music from Jones Radio Networks, along with local news and information. The station was branded "The Spirit of DeKalb County". The station added nighttime operations in 1996, running 17 watts. In August 1999, the station's format was changed to adult standards, carrying Timeless Favorites programming from ABC.

WSQR moved to 1180 kHz in late 2006. WSQR continued carrying Timeless network programming from Citadel Broadcasting until the network's shutdown in February 2010 when it adopted a classic hits format (from Citadel's Classic Hits network). WSQR returned to the adult standards format in late summer of 2011, airing Dial Global's America's Best Music, but in November 2012 switched back to classic hits, now airing Dial Global's Kool Gold format.

December 2022 92.9 is called the q and on 1180am is still called wsqr.

References

External links

Classic hits radio stations in the United States
SQR
Radio stations established in 1981
1981 establishments in Illinois